Mega Man is a science fiction superhero animated television series co-produced by Ruby-Spears Productions and Ashi Productions. It is based on the video game series of the same name by Capcom. The TV series began on September 11, 1994 and ended on January 19, 1996, lasting two seasons. A spin-off based on Mega Man X was planned, but didn't go through.

The rights to the series are currently owned by Shochiku.

Plot
Dr. Light and Dr. Wily were brilliant scientists in the field of robotics, who worked together in a laboratory trying to advance the science. One day, they finished an extremely advanced prototype, but shortly after being activated, it started destroying the laboratory. Dr. Light immediately believed that the prototype's guidance system, which Dr. Wily had personally programmed, was the source of the problem and concluded they would start over again. Angered, Dr. Wily attempted to steal the plans later that night, but Dr. Light catches him. Wily is able to steal the plans after knocking Dr. Light down, and goes off to what is apparently an abandoned area, and uses the plans to construct Proto Man.

Later, Dr. Light builds Rock and Roll, advanced robots with personalities, along with Ice Man, Guts Man, and Cut Man. Dr. Wily and Proto Man go and steal the robots, reprogramming the latter three robots as henchmen. Dr. Wily attempts to reprogram Rock and Roll at his lab later, but Rock decides to trick Dr. Wily. He tells Dr. Wily that Dr. Light also built "super warrior robots", and that if Rock and Roll are let go, he'll tell him how to defeat the robots. Rock uses this lie (Dr. Wily believing robots can't lie) to cause a distraction and escape with Roll. Dr. Light decides to reprogram and reoutfit Rock into Mega Man, who from then on keeps the world safe. This tale is told in Episode 1, "The Beginning".

Throughout the episodes, Mega Man thwarts Wily's various schemes, in a similar fashion to that of the Super Friends, usually ending with Rush acting in similar vein to Scooby-Doo.

Characters

Main
Mega Man (voiced by Ian James Corlett) – Mirroring his origins in the video games, Mega Man was originally an assistant robot built by Dr. Light and called Rock. He originally donned a blue T-shirt and shorts but also wore his typical robot boots. After Wily reprograms Light's first industrial robots (the Mega Man robot masters), he captures Rock and Roll to make them his servants too. Rock tricks Wily into freeing them as he can't conceive of a robot being able to lie. Rock is then rebuilt into a fighting robot. His primary weapon is the plasma cannon which he fires from his left arm after withdrawing his hand into it. He can also copy Wily's robots' abilities by touching them. During battle, Mega Man cracks jokes and puns. He has numerous catchphrases; the one he uses most frequently is "Sizzling circuits". Ironically, Corlett, who voices Mega Man here, previously voiced Dr. Wily in Captain N: The Game Master.
Dr. Light (voiced by Jim Byrnes) – Mega Man's creator. He used to work with Dr. Wily to create a line of industrial robots until the latter stole their plans and a defective prototype. Light built Rock, Roll and the first three robot masters (unlike the six from Mega Man 1) Cut Man, Guts Man and Ice Man. After Wily reprogrammed his industrial robots, Light rebuilds Rock into Mega Man in order to stop his schemes. Throughout the series, Light builds other robots and inventions to help humanity and to stop Wily's plots. His appearance differs slightly from his game counterpart; he has a shorter beard and grey hair. Fans of the show also note his ability to state the blatantly obvious. Jim Byrnes would later reprise his role as Dr. Light (although renamed Dr. Wright) in the English dub of Mega Man: Upon a Star.
Roll (voiced by Robyn Ross) – Mega Man's sister who assists him on missions. She was built as a household robot and possesses a number of home-appliances which switch on and off similarly to Mega Man's plasma cannon. Most frequently she uses a vacuum cleaner which has enough force to pull robots to pieces and which can also occasionally suck in enemy projectiles and fire them back. Roll is depicted as being much more mature than her game counterpart physically, and dons a red-and-yellow jumpsuit instead of a dress.
Rush (voiced by Ian James Corlett) – Mega Man's robot dog, Mega Man uses Rush's jet-mode, in which he turns into a jet board, as a primary means of transportation throughout the series. Rush also has a number of other modes though none which are directly derived from the games. Rush's nose can sniff out anything and was once used to locate a bomb planted by Wily. His ears also detect sound faraway. Rush acts similarly to Scooby Doo in many respects, often performing silly antics on his own. He also alternates between making typical dog sounds and speaking. Though most of the time, he only parrots other characters, he also appears to have a limited ability for independent speech, mostly for comedy purposes (such as announcing "Mega, Mega. Right back. Messages". during the show's commercial bumpers).

Supporting
Eddie (voiced by Scott McNeil) – A suitcase on legs, Eddie's primary function is to deliver Energy Cans (E-Tanks) to Mega Man when he is critically low on energy. Eddie is always ready for action and appears in a handful of episodes. Though resembling his game counterpart outwardly; he was colored green instead of red.
Met/Doc – A single Met acts as an assistant to Dr. Light in the first episode. It does not make an appearance in any other episodes, although it is presumed to still be around since it was not destroyed. It is not equipped with a weapon like its in-game counterparts and its only feature is a flexible grabber arm, which it uses to produce a variety of items, suggesting he was another lab assistant and a prototype for Eddie. He is referred to as "Doc".
Mayor of New York City (voiced by Garry Chalk in most appearances, Jim Byrnes in "Mega Dreams", understudied by Scott McNeil in "Campus Commandos") - Appearing in a number of episodes, the unnamed Mayor of New York City often goes to Mega Man when a crisis involving Wily is threatening New York City. Despite his inability to stop Wily, the Mayor did stand up to him during the "Big Shake", refusing to surrender control of the city despite Wily's threats, his obvious fear of him, and Mega Man being out of commission. He reappears in "Campus Commandos". The Mayor is seen again (albeit a different appearance) in the episode "Mega Dreams". In the post season two episode Crime of the Century, a new mayor is introduced. Despite the notable physical change, the old mayor being a standard size, moustached white man and the new one a large African American, Garry Chalk also provided him with the same voice. The Mayor characters did not appear in any video game and were made up for the show.
Bree Ricotta (voiced by Robyn Ross) – A recurring news reporter character, appearing most prominently in the episode "Mega-Pinnochio". Her name seems to be a reference to brie and ricotta, which are both types of cheese. She did not appear in any video game, and was made up for the show.
Mega Man X (voiced by Michael Donovan) – The main character of the Mega Man X series, X makes an appearance in the same episode as Vile and Spark Mandrill, having chased them through time to stop them from taking Lightanium back to their own time to help Sigma finance his wars against humans. Like Mega Man, X has the ability to copy weapons from enemies by touching them, as he is seen copying Snake Man's weapon to destroy Dr. Wily's plasma cannon. Unlike Mega Man, X seems to be able to copy a weapon multiple times - Mega Man can only use a copied weapon once (as he only copies it once) while X was seen copying and using Snake Man's weapon three times. X's personality is different compared in the cartoon compared to his video game counterpart. In the games, X is a pacifist and sometimes hesitates doing a job if it means risking an innocent life. In the cartoon, X is much more quick to action and doesn't have as much regard for human life, acting more like Zero, X's comrade in the video games.

Villains
 Dr. Wily (voiced by Scott McNeil in a German accent) – Light's former assistant who stole the plans for the prototype industrial robots after their first test with a humanoid robot failed. Wily was convinced that Light sabotaged his work in order to get the credit and runs off before returning with ProtoMan to reprogram Light's industrial robots. In the first episode, it is revealed that Wily has suffered envy through his entire life ("I didn't even have toys like the other children") and plans to exact vengeance on humanity by having his robots control everything. He is depicted very much like his original counterpart. He is prone to fits of maniacal laughter. Scott McNeil would later reprise his role as Dr. Willy in the English dub of Mega Man: Upon a Star although his German accent is toned down.
 Proto Man (voiced by Scott McNeil) – In this show, Proto Man is Mega Man's older brother and Wily's constant lackey. Despite working for Wily, Proto Man has a tendency to disobey him and ruin some of Wily's plans as he is obsessed with destroying his brother or recruiting him to Dr. Wily's side. Proto Man's abilities are similar to those of Mega Man; he fires plasma resembling blue energy and has on one occasion copied Guts Man's power in order to fight Mega Man. The first humanoid prototype built by Light and Wily resembles his color-scheme though it is not directly stated if Wily rebuilt Proto Man from the prototype. Unlike in the Mega Man games, Proto Man does not carry his trademark shield in the series. Unlike his counterpart from the games, he is loyal to Wily alone, filling the role that Bass plays from Mega Man 7 onwards.
 Batontons – The series version of the Bubble Bat enemies introduced in Mega Man 2. They're also referred to as Wily's Spy Bats. They're most frequently used for spying missions though they also possess the ability to attack using lighting projectiles.
 Vile (voiced by Lee Tockar) – A battle Reploid and Maverick Warrior sent from the future to obtain Lightanium power rods in the episode "Mega X". He and his partner Spark Mandrill are hoping to distribute the rods to his master Sigma (mistakenly spelled as "Cigma"), who is the leader of the Mavericks planning to use to rods to finance his war against the humans in his time. Vile has entered into an alliance with Wily after learning that Wily has gained hold of the schematics of the power plant containing the rods. As compensation for Wily helping him to get the rods, Vile allows Wily to obtain some of the rods to power up his new blaster weapon that can annihilate anything in its way. However, the two are foiled by Mega Man and his future counterpart, Mega Man X, causing Wily and his henchmen to escape after the blaster weapon is destroyed while Mega Man X drags Vile and Spark Mandrill back to their time.
 Spark Mandrill (voiced by Richard Newman) – A mandrill-themed battle Reploid and Maverick Warrior who appeared in "Mega X". He is Vile's partner, supporting Vile to obtain the Lightanium rods to finance Sigma's war on the humans in the future. He is defeated by Mega Man X, who pushed him and Vile back to their time.

Robot Masters
Various Robot Masters from the first five Mega Man classic games make appearances throughout the series, including Snake Man from Mega Man 3, Elec Man from the original Mega Man, and Pharaoh Man from Mega Man 4. Some appear more often than others, for example Snake Man appears in five episodes while Pharaoh Man appears only in the second episode and Napalm Man only appears in the introduction. None of the Robot Masters from Mega Man 6 made appearances even though the show's first episode aired a year after the game's release.

 Cut Man (voiced by Terry Klassen impersonating Peter Lorre) – One of Dr. Light's original six industrial robots that would serve as a logging robot who used his Rolling Cutters to chop down trees. He was reprogrammed by Dr. Wily and is one of his stock-lackeys alongside Guts Man and Proto Man appearing in every episode. He makes cutting and scissors-related one-liner puns ("Cutting you down to size is going to be shear delight") while laughing at his own jokes. Despite his somewhat arrogant attitude, he is usually defeated and this has become a joke among fans of the series. His overall design reflects his game counterpart though the details of his head and uniform are slightly different. Originally, he carried only one weapon that was thrown in a boomerang fashion; however later in the same episode he fired his weapon a seemingly unlimited number of times. However, he has used both methods throughout the series.
 Guts Man (voiced by Garry Chalk) – One of Dr. Light's original six industrial robots that created as a robot to help in construction. Along with Cut Man, he appears in every episode as one of Dr. Wily's main henchmen. Contrary to his persona in the games and somewhat stereotypically, Guts Man is all muscle and little brain and always attempts to crush Mega Man. A recurring joke involves Rush biting Guts Man's leg before being kicked off. Guts Man is also shown often breaking through walls in order to get somewhere, rather than using/opening doors. This habit was used in one episode to trick him. Chalk's Guts Man voice is very similar to the one he used for King Hippo on Captain N: The Game Master (who was that show's big and strong but slow-witted character as well).
 Ice Man (voiced by Terry Klassen in an Italian-American accent) - An Inuit-themed robot with ice attacks who is one of Dr. Light's original six industrial robots that was created to help out with arctic work until he was reprogrammed by Dr. Wily. In "Ice Age, he got jealous of Dr. Wily's freezing plot that involved Air Man and acted out his own plan that involved using Ice Bots in order to get revenge on Dr. Wily.
 Fire Man - A fire-themed robot who is one of Dr. Light's original six industrial robots that was created for construction until he was reprogrammed by Dr. Wily. He only appeared in the first episode and had no dialogue. In addition, he has flames painted on his blasters.
 Bomb Man (voiced by Terry Klassen) - A bomb-throwing robot who is one of Dr. Light's original six industrial robots that was created to for demolition until he was reprogrammed by Dr. Wily. A running gag is that Bomb Man would often be destroyed by someone either shooting his bombs or deflecting his bombs.
 Elec Man (voiced by Terry Klassen) - An electrical robot who is one of the Dr. Light's original six industrial robots that was created for construction until he was reprogrammed by Dr. Wily. This version has a muscular appearance similar to Mega Man and Proto Man. In addition, his Thunder Beam is more a straightforward attack than the version seen in the video game.
 Air Man (voiced by Terry Klassen) - A fan-themed robot who does not get along with Ice Man. Unlike the video games, Air Man has a human-like face and is taller than Guts Man.
 Crash Man (voiced by Terry Klassen in an Italian-American accent) - He was first seen in "Mega-Pinocchio" attacking a building until he is repelled by Mega Man. His Crash Bombs are renamed Time Bombs where they have drills at the tip of them.
 Heat Man (voiced by Garry Chalk) - A Zippo lighter-shaped robot that does fire attacks. While he does not use his Atomic Fire ability, he still spits fire from his mouth.
 Metal Man (voiced by Ian James Corlett) - A robot who can attack with circular saw-shaped metal blades. He can also turn his hands into saw blades.
 Quick Man (voiced by Jim Byrnes) - A robot with quick reflexes who attacks with the boomerang from his head and the laser boomerangs shot from his wrist.
 Wood Man (voiced by Richard Newman) - A wood-themed robot. His Leaf Shield in the show is depicted as a large leaf-shaped shield.
 Gemini Man (voiced by Tony Sampson) - In this show, Gemini Man has a nose, was not shown using his ability to make copies of himself, instead he uses his Gemini Laser. He was once used to portray the lead guitarist of the band Cold Steel as part of Dr. Wily's plot to brainwash humans into obeying Dr. Wily's every command.
 Hard Man (voiced by Terry Klassen) - A robot with a very strong body and a habit of using the word "hard" in his sentences. Like Gemini Man, Hard Man is given a nose. While Hard Man doesn't utilize his Hard Knuckle, Mega Man copies this ability. Dr. Wily used him in "Bad Day at Peril Park" as part of his plot to brainwash the attendees of Fun World into thinking that they are robots.
 Magnet Man (voiced by Terry Klassen) - A magnet-themed robot. In this show, Magnet Man uses his hands to do magnetic abilities and he does not use his Magnet Missiles.
 Needle Man (voiced by Garry Chalk) - A needle-themed robot. His Needle Cannon still functions in the same manner.
 Shadow Man (voiced by Terry Klassen) - A ninja-themed robot. The only difference in the TV series that Shadow Man can also throw the blade on his head.
 Snake Man (voiced by Ian James Corlett) - A snake-themed robot. In this show, his Search Snakes are fired as projectiles that can chew through anything. In "Bot Transfer," Snake Man once had his circuits swapped with Mega Man's circuits thanks to a machine that Dr. Wily made.
 Spark Man (voiced by Garry Chalk in his normal voice, Tony Sampson in his disguised voice) - A spark-themed robot. In this show, his Spark Shot is performed when he touches his two needles to a surface instead of firing them. While he was briefly seen in "Mega-Pinocchio," Spark Man was once used to portray the drummer of the band Cold Steel as part of Dr. Wily's plot to brainwash humans into obeying Dr. Wily's every command.
 Top Man (voiced by Jim Byrnes) - A top-themed robot. In this show, Top Man is taller than his video game counterpart.
 Bright Man (voiced by Garry Chalk) - A robot with a lightbulb on top of his head. In this show, his Flash Stopper induces temporarily blindness causing Mega Man to use sunglasses when fighting him.
 Dive Man (voiced by Terry Klassen) - A submarine-themed robot. Unlike the video game, Dive Man does not have propeller feet and his chest is not in the shape of a keel. In addition, his Dive Missiles are fired from the cannon on his arm.
 Drill Man (voiced by Scott McNeil) - A drill-themed robot.
 Dust Man (voiced by Terry Klassen in a raspy voice) - A vacuum cleaner-themed robot. Similar to Air Man, Dust Man has a human-like head.
 Pharaoh Man (voiced by Terry Klassen) - A pharaoh-themed robot.
 Toad Man (voiced by Terry Klassen) - A toad-themed robot. In this show, Toad Man was redesigned with a mouth and a prehensile tongue as well as being able to fire his Rain Flush into the sky. Dr. Wily used Toad Man in "Robosaurus Park" where he fired his Rain Flush attack modified with Dr. Wily's formula that devolved the minds of any robot exposed to it.
 Ring Man (voiced by Garry Chalk) - A ring-themed robot. He once used a hoverboard in "Mega-Pinocchio" and later an air fighter in "Bad Day at Peril Park."
 Crystal Man (voiced by Terry Klassen) - A crystal-themed robot who once assisted Dr. Wily in targeting a space station's lenses. In this show, his Crystal Eye is fired from his arm rather than his chest where it explodes like a bomb.
 Dark Man (voiced by Garry Chalk) - A robot who is one of Dr. Wily's most powerful robots. Dark Man can manipulate electromagnetic energies in different ways.
 Gravity Man (voiced by Jim Byrnes) - A gravity-manipulating robot.
 Gyro Man (voiced by Garry Chalk in his normal voice, Jim Byrnes in a disguised voice) - A robot with helicopter blades on his back. Unlike the video game, Gyro Man uses the blades on his back to attack instead of his gyro launches. While Gyro Man is not shown flying, Mega Man does when he copies Gyro Man's abilities. He was once used to portray the lead guitarist of the band Cold Steel as part of Dr. Wily's plot to brainwash humans into obeying Dr. Wily's every command.
 Star Man (voiced by Terry Klassen) - A star-themed robot. His Star Crash fires star-shaped blasts towards his target instead of forming a barrier around himself.
 Stone Man (voiced by Garry Chalk) - A rock-themed robot. In this show, Stone Man has two blue tubes on his shoulders and a cannon that he uses to fire his Power Stone attack. Dr. Wily used him "Big Shake" to assist Drill Man in causing earthquakes in New York City.
 Wave Man - An aquatic robot. His Water Wave in this show channels a powerful water current.
 Napalm Man - An armored robot equipped with missiles. He only appeared in the intro of the TV series.

Production 
Mega Man starred in a Saturday-morning style cartoon that premiered in 1994. Ruby-Spears, one of the producers of the show, redesigned the characters from the Mega Man video games to varying degrees. The show had a budget of 300,000 dollars per episode. It was originally designed in an art style matching the games' artwork. "Appearance in Japan", the first episode of Mega Man: Upon a Star, was made as test footage and intended to be a special episode of the series, as it had the same animation and used the same voice actors as the cartoon in production. However, it was a big budget, and so the animation style had to change. The new art style was based on redesigns of the characters Keiji Inafune had done in his spare time. "Appearance in Japan" still aired on TV in 1994, as an after school special on various TV stations and in Japan on TV Tokyo. If the series' art style hadn't changed, it would've aired alongside two similarly cancelled shows: an English dub of Magic Knight Rayearth starring Venus Terzo as Luce, and an American adaptation of Sailor Moon utilizing live-action and animation with Adrienne Barbeau as Queen Beryl and Queen Serenity.

Music 
The theme and background music was composed and produced by John Lee Mitchell and Tom Keenlyside at Anitunes Music. An official soundtrack was also released with songs by artists such as Sugar Ray. The cover of the soundtrack is from an early promotional image. Nearly all of the show's background music was reused in the early 2000s Westwood Media/Ocean Group dub of Dragon Ball Z, which covered episodes 108 to 276.

Episodes

Season 1 (1994)

Season 2 (1995–1996)

Release

Broadcast
Mega Man entered first-run syndication in the United States on September 17, 1994, and aired new episodes through January 1996. It was rerun on Fox Family Channel (now Freeform) between 1999 and 2001.

Home video release
Episodes were released on VHS by Sony Wonder beginning in January 1995.

The entire series was released on 2 DVD sets by ADV Films in 2003. Both sets are now out-of-print. In 2009, ADV Films re-released the 1st half of the series, but was shut down in 2009. Discotek Media released the entire series on September 30, 2014.

Reception
At one time, Mega Man was placed as the number one weekly syndicated children's show in the Nielsen ratings.

See also
 MegaMan NT Warrior
 Mega Man Star Force
 Mega Man: Fully Charged

References

Footnotes

Sources

External links

 
 A website dedicated to the Mega Man Cartoon Series
 

1990s American animated television series
1994 American television series debuts
1996 American television series endings
1990s Canadian animated television series
1994 Canadian television series debuts
1996 Canadian television series endings
1994 Japanese television series debuts
1996 Japanese television series endings
ADV Films
American children's animated action television series
American children's animated adventure television series
American children's animated science fantasy television series
American children's animated superhero television series
American television shows based on video games
Canadian children's animated action television series
Canadian children's animated adventure television series
Canadian children's animated science fantasy television series
Canadian children's animated superhero television series
Canadian television shows based on video games
Japanese children's animated action television series
Japanese children's animated adventure television series
Japanese children's animated science fantasy television series
Japanese children's animated superhero television series
Animated series based on Mega Man
Anime-influenced Western animated television series
Ruby-Spears superheroes
Television series by Ruby-Spears
First-run syndicated television programs in the United States
Animated television series about robots
Ashi Productions
Discotek Media